The Jeep Forward Control is a truck that was produced by Willys Motors, later named Kaiser Jeep, from 1956 to 1965. It was also assembled in other international markets. The layout featured a cab over (forward control) design.

The Forward Control models were primarily marketed as work vehicles for corporate, municipal, military, as well as civilian use. Regular pickup box beds were standard and customers were offered a large number of "Jeep approved" specialized bodies from outside suppliers. These ranged from simple flatbeds to complete tow trucks, dump trucks, and fire trucks. The vehicles were also manufactured under license in India and Spain.

Design 
Willys produced utility vehicles that remained almost unchanged since 1947. As the marketplace grew more competitive in the 1950s, management developed a new range of modern cab and body trucks. The independent designer that was contracted by Willys since the 1940s, Brooks Stevens, used styling cues from full-size cab-over-engine trucks for this new futuristic-looking space-efficient vehicle with the center grille panel made to imitate the classic seven-slot Jeep design. The unconventional forward control layout and "helicopter look" of the cab was too unusual for mainstream buyers during that era, but they were successful in specialty markets that included airport service vehicles, tow trucks, and railroad crew trucks that could ride the rails. Numerous versions of the Forward Control Jeeps were manufactured for general and specialized applications with 1957 being the top production with almost 10,000 vehicles built that year.

Engineering was based on existing CJ-5. Power came from the Hurricane F-head and L-head 4-cylinder engines. The updates in 1958 on both the FC-150 and 170 versions had attained a goal established by Willys engineers to design a versatile commercial vehicle in which the ratio of the vehicle's curb weight to its payload was 1 to 1. According to the Society of Automotive Engineers (SAE), this was regarded as the lowest ratio offered by domestic manufacturers at that time within the standard light-duty commercial vehicle segment. The FC layout offered advantages including a short turning radius and large cargo bed size given the compact overall length.

Proposals included a "Forward Control Commuter" design that may have been among the earliest minivan-type vehicles. Three operational concept cars were built by Reutter in Stuttgart, West Germany. Brooks Stevens was also involved in the transformation of this truck platform into a passenger vehicle.

FC-150 

This was a record-breaking six-foot length (with the tailgate up) load bed on a vehicle whose total  length was two inches shorter than the diminutive two-seat Nash Metropolitan. The rugged design and go-anywhere capability included a claim that the FC could climb grades of up to 60% and reviews by Mechanix Illustrated highlighted the vehicle's toughness and surefootedness.

In 1958, the FC-150 received a new, wider chassis. A 1958 FC-150 concept featured an  wheelbase, a widened track (which made production), and the new T-98 4-speed manual transmission.

FC-170 

Introduced in 1957, FC-170 models had a  wheelbase with a  bed. This was achieved by the forward-control layout. The cab did not tilt for engine access. The standard 6 cylinder engine was mated to a 3 speed transmission. A 1958 concept version of the FC-170 featured a  wheelbase. This was required to accommodate a new  V8 engine (based on the Ford Y-block) with a new transfer case. A new 3-speed automatic transmission (based on the Ford Cruise-O-Matic) was only available with the inline-6 due to possible driveshaft angle issues. A T-98 4-speed manual was available with both engines.

FC-170 DRW 
A  dual-wheeled rear axle (dually) model with a  load bed.

FC-180 
The FC-180 was shown in concept form on paper in a 1957 Willys company brochure titled "1958 Projects - Product Engineering". It was essentially a lengthened FC-170 DRW (wheelbase increased from 103 in to 123.5 in). Features included a 150 in flatbed, the  "Super Hurricane" inline-6 or the  V8 as available engines, and the T-98 4-speed manual or 3-speed automatic as available transmissions.

FC-190 
The FC-190 was also shown in concept form in 1957. It featured a  wheelbase, a  flat bed and tandem dually axles. The T-98 manual transmission was standard with the automatic as an option. No six-cylinder option was offered; standard was the  V8. The FC-190 would use components from the FC-170 and FC-180 to keep costs down.

Production 
The FC Jeeps were exhibited to Jeep dealers in a closed-circuit telecast on November 29, 1956, and were on display for the public at the December 1956 National Automobile Show in New York City. The FC-150 went on sale at dealer showrooms on December 12, 1956. The initial response to the four-wheel drive FC Jeeps was favorable. Their best sales year came in 1957, when 9,738 trucks were sold. After the introduction of the FC-170 in 1957, FC-150 sales dropped to 1,546 units in 1959, before rebounding to 4,925 in 1960.

Brooks Stevens made a rendering around 1960 for a possible facelift for the FC-series.

The FC models did not become the big sellers that Willys had hoped. Total production in nine years was just over 30,000 units. The FC line was discontinued in 1964.

Military variants 
Four dedicated military variants of the FC-170 were manufactured for the U.S. Navy and Marine Corps, under a 1964 contract. Production is estimated to have been between 400 and 700 units, mostly the M677 four-door pickups. A 1963 analysis done by Jeep, concluded that the militarized FC-170s compared favorably to the aging Dodge M37, at least for behind the front-line service. The XM-676 prototype had a 50% larger cargo cube, could carry 12 troops in the back instead of eight in the M-37, had a 700-pound greater load rating, and yielded more than twice the mileage, but Jeep was likely more focused on landing the contract for the M715 trucks that replaced the M-37.

The official operator's and service manuals were written and published by Kaiser-Jeep – not by the army. The general government description of the vehicles was 'Jeep' Truck, Diesel engine, 7000-pound GVW, 4x4, with the variants named:
 M676 Truck, Cargo Pickup — a modified version of the commercial FC-170 pickup
 M677 Truck, Cargo Pickup w/4 Dr. Cab — a four-door crew-cab pickup with a canopy over the bed
 M678 Truck, Carry All — a van-body FC-170 with windows, and three cabin doors, and
 M679 Truck, Ambulance — a van-body FC-170 with two cabin doors and no further side windows, fitted as an ambulance

There were notable mechanical differences with the civilian market vehicles. First of all, the Marine Corps variants of the FC-170s were powered by a different engine – a Cerlist  three-cylinder  two-stroke diesel. The engine was mated with a three-speed T-90A transmission and a model 18 transfer case. Other changes included a reinforced frame, 24-volt electrical system, as well as limited-slip Spicer 44 front and Spicer 53 rear axles.

Foreign market models
Numerous versions of FC models (most not available in the domestic market) were manufactured in many other nations under collaboration agreements with successive owners of Jeep: Willys-Overland, Kaiser Jeep, and American Motors Corporation (AMC).

India 

Mahindra & Mahindra Limited in Bombay (Mumbai), India began its vehicle business in 1947 by assembling 75 complete knock down (CKD) Jeeps in Mazagon, Bombay. The company started FC-150 production in India in 1965 and later expanded the model range for the domestic market to include the FC-170, as well as its own intermediate-sized FC-160.

The FC-160 (and later FJ-160) uses a  wheelbase. The pick-up box was by Mahindra and other bodies were available. The "cowl and chassis only" FC-160 model was popular during the 1970s for conversion into mini-buses, ambulances, and other vehicles. Most have the basic front face of the FC. The manufacture of the Mahindra FC-160 pickup truck ended in the summer of 1999.

The FC-260 Diesel light truck was introduced in 1975. Currently, Mahindra's four-wheel drive FJ-460 (introduced in 1983) and two-wheel drive FJ-470 van or mini-bus vehicles retain the grille arrangement of the original Forward Control. These vehicles can accommodate from 11 to 15 passengers plus the driver.

Spain 

In the 1960s, Kaiser-Willys licensed Vehículos Industriales y Agrícolas (VIASA) of Zaragoza in Aragon to build Jeeps in Spain. Beginning in 1970, the "SV" line of commercial trucks were built using the Commando 4x4 Jeep chassis, just like the FC models in the United States.

However, the Iberian models were unlike any Jeeps produced anywhere else and featured indigenously developed body designs. The SV line included the Campeador (one-ton pickup), Duplex (double cab pickup), Furgon (one-ton van), and the Toledo (9-seat luxury passenger van). Two engines were available: the Super Hurricane in-line six petrol and a Perkins 4-cylinder diesel. The diesel achieved almost .

During the late 1970s, VIASA was absorbed by Ebro trucks, a division of Motor Ibérica. Production of the full SV line continued until 1985, which also included versions for the Spanish army.

Nissan took complete control of Ebro in 1987 and the company was named Nissan Motor Ibérica.

Wide-track concept 
Kaiser contracted Crown Coach Corporation, a bus manufacturer, to build a "Wide-Trac" forward control concept car that combines elements of the original Jeep FC trucks, the VIASA SV pickup, and Brooks Stevens' 1960 proposed facelift.

Notes

References

External links 

 The FC Connection, retrieved on September 14, 2010.

Forward Control
Pickup trucks
All-wheel-drive vehicles
Cab over vehicles
Cab over off-road vehicles
Vehicles introduced in 1956
1950s cars
1960s cars
Kaiser Motors
Willys vehicles
Motor vehicles manufactured in the United States
Trucks of the United States